Amber Harris (born January 16, 1988) is a professional basketball player. She last played for the Chicago Sky of the Women's National Basketball Association (WNBA). She played college basketball at Xavier.

Xavier statistics

Source

WNBA
Harris was selected the first round of the 2011 WNBA Draft (4th overall) by the Minnesota Lynx., the second of two Lynx first round picks. Harris served primarily as a bench player, averaging 3.3 points per game on a team that had the best record in the Western Conference. Harris continued to be a role player in the playoffs, but still had some notable moments, including a key three-pointer in the Finals against the Atlanta Dream, which ultimately helped the Lynx win the WNBA championship.

WNBA career statistics

Regular season

|-
|style="text-align:left;background:#afe6ba;"|  2011†
| align="left" | Minnesota
| 27 || 0 || 10.3 || .398 || .000 || .742 || 2.2 || 0.4 || 0.1 || 0.4 || 0.5 || 3.3
|-
| align="left" | 2012
| align="left" | Minnesota
| 27 || 0 || 8.9 || .404 || .389 || .682 || 1.9 || 0.6 || 0.3 || 0.5 || 0.6 || 3.5
|-
|style="text-align:left;background:#afe6ba;"|  2013†
| align="left" | Minnesota
| 30 || 1 || 8.8 || .375 || .143 || .714 || 1.5 || 0.7 || 0.1 || 0.2 || 0.5 || 2.4
|-
| align="left" | 2017
| align="left" | Chicago
| 27 || 0 || 5.9 || .396 || .000 || .625 || 1.6 || 0.2 || 0.1 || 0.3 || 0.3 || 1.6
|-
| align="left" | 2018
| align="left" | Chicago
| 1 || 0 || 2.0 || .000 || .000 || .000 || 0.0 || 0.0 || 0.0 || 0.0 || 0.0 || 0.0
|-
| align="left" | Career
| align="left" | 5 years, 2 teams
| 112 || 1 || 8.4 || .394 || .209 || .707 || 1.8 || 0.5 || 0.2 || 0.3 || 0.4 || 2.7

Playoffs

|-
|style="text-align:left;background:#afe6ba;"|  2011†
| align="left" | Minnesota
| 6 || 0 || 5.2 || .400 || 1.000 || .000 || 1.2 || 0.2 || 0.2 || 0.0 || 0.0 || 1.5
|-
| align="left" | 2012
| align="left" | Minnesota
| 6 || 0 || 4.2 || .444 || .250 || .500 || 0.7 || 0.0 || 0.0 || 0.0 || 0.3 || 1.7
|-
|style="text-align:left;background:#afe6ba;"|  2013†
| align="left" | Minnesota
| 5 || 0 || 3.0 || .333 || .000 || .000 || 0.8 || 0.0 || 0.0 || 0.2 || 0.4 || 0.8
|-
| align="left" | Career
| align="left" | 3 years, 1 team
| 17 || 0 || 4.2 || .400 || .400 || .500 || 0.9 || 0.1 || 0.1 || 0.1 || 0.2 || 1.4

References

External links
Xavier Musketeers bio

1988 births
Living people
All-American college women's basketball players
American expatriate basketball people in China
American women's basketball players
Basketball players from Indianapolis
Chicago Sky players
Forwards (basketball)
Guangdong Vermilion Birds players
McDonald's High School All-Americans
Minnesota Lynx draft picks
Minnesota Lynx players
Parade High School All-Americans (girls' basketball)
Xavier Musketeers women's basketball players